Maynas may refer to:

 Maynas Province, Peru
 Maynas language